Clivina kawa is a species of ground beetle in the subfamily Scaritinae. It was described by Basilewsky in 1948.

References

kawa
Beetles described in 1948